Indians in Vietnam consist of migrants to Vietnam from India, both historical and recent. , there were about 5500 people of Indian origin settled in Vietnam, mainly in Ho Chi Minh City. Prior to the Vietnam War, there was a vibrant Indian community consisting of primarily Tamils, and specifically the Chettiars.

The Cham people (remnants of the Champa Kingdom) of central Vietnam share a long history with India.

Today, the majority of Indians in Vietnam practice a religious syncretism of Hinduism with Mahayana Buddhism. Hindu temples serve both Hindus and Buddhists.

There are two main groups of Indians in Vietnam: 
The Pre-1975 Indian-Vietnamese, who have been living in Vietnam since the late 1800s; 
and the Post-1990s Indian expats who arrived after the Doi Moi economic reforms, as entrepreneurs, business people, professionals and foreign workers.

Pre-1975 Indian-Vietnamese 
In contemporary history, Indians began migrating to Vietnam in the late 19th century, in search for better economic prospects, and/or for colonial civil service.

The Indian migrants came from different regions of India:

- From South India (Deccan) 
 Civil servants from French colonies in India viz. Pondicherry 
 South Indian entrepreneurs and traders viz. Chettiars and Tamil Muslims 
 Unskilled South Indian laborers
- From North and West India
 Gujarati and Sindhi merchants from Mumbai (Bombay)
 Sikhs and other Punjabis as security guards and shop owners.

Per the 1937 census by the French Indochinese colonial regime, about 2000 Indians resided in Southern Vietnam (Cochinchina), and another 1000 in Northern Vietnam (Tonkin), Central Vietnam (Annam) and Laos. An estimated 3,000 - 4,000 Indians lived in the Republic of Vietnam (South Vietnam) in the 1950s and 60s, very few to none in Communist North Vietnam after its independence in 1945. A Vietnamese source estimated that around 1000 Indians were in Saigon in the 1950s, of whom 400 were from the former French India, and the remainder were the Bombay Gujarati and Sindhi merchants. The Hindu, Muslim and Sikh faiths were represented. The majority were South Indian, and the North Indians were a visible minority. Many Indian-Vietnamese lived in Saigon, coupled with a much smaller presence in Đà Nẵng, Đà Lạt, Huế, and Nha Trang.

The Gujaratis and the Sindhis traded textile, clothing, jewelry and tailoring services; especially in Saigon, where they had many shops. The Chettiars engaged in banking, brokerage, and the rental of commercial buildings, vehicles, boats etc. The Chettiars began their return to India in 1963 due to the political instability after the 1963 coup d'état and assassination of President Ngo Dinh Diem. Tamil Muslims built several mosques in Saigon in the 1930s, including the Central Mosque (vi: Thánh Đường Đông Du (Dong Du Mosque)) (ar: Jamia Al-Musulman), the Chợ Lớn Mosque (vi: Thánh Đường Chợ Lớn), and the Jamiul Islamiyah Mosque. Tamil Hindus constructed several prominent temples, notably the Sri Mariamman temple in Ho Chi Minh City, which is also a tourist attraction.; and the Sikhs built a gurdwara, which now serves as a pharmaceuticals office. Some non-Muslim Indians as well as Muslim Indians, married Vietnamese women. Some Chettiars, had both, a Vietnamese spouse in Vietnam and a Chettiar wife in India.

After the Fall of Saigon 
After the 1975 Communist invasion of South Vietnam, the Communist regime confiscated and collectivized all private property in the South for little to no compensation, as it had done in the North since 1945. This included the confiscation of Indian-owned private properties such as homes, businesses and places of worship. The former South's free market economy was ended, as a result of the state-run economy. Foreigners were unwelcome and harassed. The Indian-Vietnamese fearing further persecution, exited Vietnam, depleting the pre-1975 Indian-Vietnamese presence. The pre-1975 Indian-Vietnamese are few in number today.

See also

 India–Vietnam relations
 Hinduism in Vietnam
Religion in Vietnam
Vietnamese Pop Singer Julie Quang

References

Ethnic groups in Vietnam
Vietnam
Vietnam